Silarestan is a village in Kohgiluyeh and Boyer-Ahmad Province, Iran.

Silarestan may also refer to:
 Silarestan-e Olya Dam Ludab, Kohgiluyeh and Boyer-Ahmad Province
 Silarestan-e Sofla Dam Ludab, Kohgiluyeh and Boyer-Ahmad Province